Aethecerinus wilsonii is a species of beetle in the family Cerambycidae. It was described by George Henry Horn in 1860.

References

Trachyderini
Beetles described in 1860